Udon is a type of noodle used in Japanese cuisine.

Udon may also refer to:

Udon Entertainment, a Canadian art studio and publisher
Udon Thani Province, a province in Thailand
Udon Thani, capital city of Udon Thani Province
Udon (horse), a horse that competed in dressage with Steffen Peters

See also